Armen Babakhanian is an Armenian pianist.

He received prizes at the Leeds (5th prize), Van Cliburn (5th prize), and Gina Bachauer (2nd prize) competitions. His performance of Dmitri Shostakovich's Piano Quintet along with the Takács Quartet at the XIII Paloma O'Shea Competition earned him the Chamber Music award. These awards launched an intense international concert career. He's a member of the Cadence ensemble. The Cadence ensemble is noticeable for performing famous Argentine tango composer Astor Piazzolla's music.

On 26 May 2008 Babakhanian was distinguished a Merited Artist of Armenia. Days before he had been awarded the Strengthening Cultural Ties Between Armenia and Diaspora Golden Medal from the Ministry of Culture.

External links
 Armen Babakhanyan - Armenian National Music
   N.A.B. Artists Management

Living people
Year of birth missing (living people)
Armenian pianists
Armenian classical pianists
Prize-winners of the Leeds International Pianoforte Competition
Prize-winners of the Gina Bachauer International Piano Competition
21st-century classical pianists